Matthew Vincent Arroyo (born September 1, 1982) is a former American professional mixed martial artist. He was featured on the Ultimate Fighting Championship reality television show The Ultimate Fighter: Team Hughes vs. Team Serra, fighting on Team Serra. He fights out of Tampa, Florida with Gracie Tampa, under Royce Gracie black belt Rob Kahn.

Mixed martial arts career

The Ultimate Fighter
In his first bout of the competition, Arroyo was able to submit Dorian Price via rear naked choke in the first round. After losing a coin toss to Troy Mandaloniz, Arroyo was going to train with Team Hughes, but he and Richie Hightower both decided to continue training with Team Serra. Matt Hughes cornered his quarterfinal fight with Mandaloniz, whom he defeated via armbar in the first round.

During the coaches' bowling competition, Arroyo successfully coached Matt Serra to victory over Matt Hughes.

While preparing for his semifinal match vs. Mac Danzig, Arroyo sustained a rib injury and had to withdraw from the competition, prompting Dana White to select John Kolosci as his replacement. Arroyo went on to defeat John Kolosci at The Ultimate Finale 6 via submission (armbar) at 4:42 of the first round.

UFC career
After the end of the show, Arroyo was given a fight against John Kolosci at The Ultimate Finale 6. Arroyo won by submission via armbar in the first round. He then had a rematch against Matt Brown at The Ultimate Finale 7. Arroyo lost the bout by TKO in the second round. He lost to Dan Cramer at UFC 94: St-Pierre vs. Penn 2, by split decision. After the loss, Arroyo was released from the UFC.

Arroyo appears as a playable character in the video game UFC Undisputed 2009.

Personal life
Arroyo holds a Bachelor of Science degree from The University of Tampa, where he was also the president of his fraternity, Pi Kappa Phi. After college he sold life insurance for a year before committing himself to fighting full-time. 

He is currently very active in Brazilian Jiu-Jitsu tournaments. He has recently opened up his own MMA academy known as Gracie Tampa South with his mentor Rob Kahn. On December 30, 2009, Arroyo received his black belt in BJJ under Rob Kahn.

Championships and accomplishments
Ultimate Fighting Championship
Submission of the Night (one time) vs. John Kolosci

Mixed martial arts record

|-
|Loss
|align=center|3–3
|Dan Cramer
|Decision (split)
|UFC 94
|
|align=center|3
|align=center|5:00
|Las Vegas, Nevada, United States
|
|-
|Loss
|align=center|3–2
|Matt Brown
|TKO (punches)
|The Ultimate Fighter 7 Finale
|
|align=center|2
|align=center|3:40
|Las Vegas, Nevada, United States
|
|-
|Win
|align=center|3–1
|John Kolosci
|Submission (armbar)
|The Ultimate Fighter 6 Finale
|
|align=center|1
|align=center|4:42
|Las Vegas, Nevada, United States
|<small>
|-
|Win
|align=center|2–1
|Ariel Pena
|Submission (triangle choke)
|Real Fighting Championships 8: Invasion of the Cage
|
|align=center|1
|align=center|1:39
|Tampa, Florida, United States
|
|-
|Loss
|align=center|1–1
|Matt Brown
|TKO (punches)
|Real Fighting Championships 7: Night of Champions 
|
|align=center|2
|align=center|1:54
|Tampa, Florida, United States
|
|-
|Win
|align=center|1–0
|Naeem Munir
|Submission (rear-naked choke)
|Combat Fighting Championship 2
|
|align=center|1
|align=center|0:56
|Orlando, Florida, United States
|

References

External links
 Matt Arroyo's official website
 
 
 Matt Arroyo's Myspace page
 Gracie Tampa

1982 births
American male mixed martial artists
Mixed martial artists from Florida
Welterweight mixed martial artists
Mixed martial artists utilizing Brazilian jiu-jitsu
American practitioners of Brazilian jiu-jitsu
People awarded a black belt in Brazilian jiu-jitsu
Living people
People from Cobleskill, New York
Ultimate Fighting Championship male fighters